Luis Carlos Miranda Cordal (born Santiago, Chile, 17 July 1945), also known as Carlos Miranda is a Spanish composer, pianist, conductor and actor.

Life and career 

He was born in Chile, where he studied at the  composition with Gustavo Becerra-Schmidt and piano with Flora Guerra. He moved to Italy and worked as apprentice in films by Franco Zeffirelli (Romeo and Juliet) and Pier Paolo Pasolini (Teorema). He then settled in London, initially working nights as accompanist to American cabaret singer Militia Battlefield (portrayed in Jana Bokova's 1975 documentary film of the same name, and days as pianist repetiteur at The Dance Centre (Covent Garden) for various dance teachers among which: Errol Addison, Matt Mattox, Brigitte Kelly and John O'Brien.

He won a British Council Scholarship to the Royal College of Music in London studying piano with Harry Platts, composition with John Lambert and conducting with Vernon Handley. After graduating, he joined the Rambert Dance Company (1974–78) as pianist and resident composer, playing and writing scores for both dance performances and concerts with the Mercury Ensemble.

In 1977 he wrote the music for the full-length dance-theatre work "Cruel Garden", choreographed by Christopher Bruce, scenario and direction by Lindsay Kemp. The piece, based on the life and death of Federico García Lorca, has since been staged by various dance companies in the UK, Germany and the USA. The BBC television adaptation, directed by Colin Nears, won the Prix Italia Music-1982.

His association with Lindsay Kemp began with his earliest creation for Rambert Dance Co., the recently revived ballet "The Parades Gone By". He then joined the Lindsay Kemp Company writing the music and collaborating in the creation of various dance-theatre productions that toured Europe, the Americas, Israel, Singapore, Japan and Australia: "A Midsummer Night's Dream", "Mr. Punch's Pantomime", "Duende, Poema Fantastico per F. Garcia Lorca", "The Big Parade" (Producciones Julio Alvarez), "Nijinsky il Matto" (Teatro Alla Scala, Milano), "Cinderella, a Gothic Operetta" (Cenicienta S.L), "Variété" (Susumu Matahira-Tate Corporation), "Dreamdances" (Italian tour 2001) and "Elizabeth I, the last dance"<ref>[http://screen.artshub.com.au/news-article/reviews/film/robert-chuter/elizabeth-i-the-last-dance-246368 Article on Elizabeth I, The Last Dance film in Screen Arts Hub]</ref>

Carlos Miranda has produced scores for movies directed by independent Spanish film-makers, among which: Celestino Coronado’s "Hamlet" (1977) and "A Midsummer Night's Dream" (1984), Manuel Huerga's "Gaudì" (1988), Félix Rotaeta's "The Pleasure of Killing" (1988) and "Chatarra" (1991).

In 1992 Carlos Miranda composed the music and conducted the Barcelona Symphony and Catalonia National Orchestra for the Parade of Nations during the 1992 Summer Olympics, and also created the soundtrack for the official video of the Seville Expo '92.

In 1993 he conducted the Orquestra de Cambra Teatre Lliure in performances of his score for the full-length ballet "El Jardiner" for Compañía de Danza Gelabert Azzopardi. In 1997 he wrote the piece "Quell Inocente Figlio" for the BBC Radio 3 series "The Schubert Songbook". In 2004 he composed and recorded the music for multimedia dance spectacle "Glimpse"Dance Review: A 'Glimpse' into the senses – Pittsburgh Post-Gazette (2004) (Barcelona FORUM) collaborating with choreographer/dancer Cesc Gelabert and American media-dance filmmaker Charles Atlas. That year he also wrote the instrumental piece "Del Amor Insomne Noche" (City of London Festival) later recorded for BBC Radio 3 by the Galliard Ensemble Wind Quintet, with Lucy Wakeford (harp) and Colin Currie (marimba).

Films as an actor
Among the films he has acted in: Velvet Goldmine (Todd Haynes – 1998), Mauvais Esprit (Patrick Alessandrin – 2003), The Feast of the Goat (Luis Llosa – 2005), Goya's Ghosts (Miloš Forman – 2006), Karol: The Pope, The Man (made for TV, Giacomo Battiato – 2006) and The Promise, (Terry George – 2016).

 The Assassination of Trotsky (1972) – Sheldon Harte
 Chronicle of a Death Foretold (1987)
 A Show of Force (1990) – Thug
 Havana (1990) – Inspector No. 1
 Captain Ron (1992) – Pirate
 Velvet Goldmine (1998) – Pianist
 Duplo Exilio (2001) – INS Agent 1
 The Feast of the Goat (2005) – Antonio Imbert Barrera
 Los Reyes: La verdadera historia de Buster y El Camaleón (2014) – Coronel

Discography
 Carlos Miranda "A Midsummer Night's Dream", The Lindsay Kemp Co. CD- Fonè Records
 Carlos Miranda "The Big Parade", The Lindsay Kemp Co. CD- Fonè Records
 Carlos Miranda "Cinderella, a gothic operetta" CD- Miranda Records
 "Chilean Music of the 20th Century, Volumes VII and VIII", Luis Carlos Miranda, pianist

Awards
 "Cruel Garden" Special Award 1979, Belgrade International Theatre Festival – BITEF"Dancers" (film directed by John Chesworth, Derek Hart) Special Prize for Music, Krakow Film Festival 1979
 "A Midsumer night's Dream" Special Award 1981, Belgrade International Theatre Festival – BITEF"Cruel Garden"'' Prix Italia Music 1982

See also
 Carlos Miranda Interview, BBC Radio 3
 "Sogno di una notte di mezza estate" – archivio di 393 diapositive (Pino Addante, photographer)
 "Cruel Garden" in 50 Years in Dance 
 René Amengual – Sonatina (1939), played by Luis Carlos Miranda, piano
 "Elizabeth I, the last dance" in Lorenzo Cutùli's sketches for the set
 "Glimpse" Portfolio
 Barcelona 1992 Olympic Ceremonies
 Barcelona 1992 Olympics, Spanish Team Parade
 Carlos Miranda portrait of the Chilean composer. Prato , 1983

References

External links

 Carlos Miranda Website
 
 Entry on Carlos Miranda and "Del Amor Insomne Noche"
 Performing Arts Collector's Home entry on "A Midsummer Night's Dream" (1985)
 Designing Shakespeare Collection – Performance details on "A Midsummer Night's Dream"
 "Cruel Garden film" on IMDB
 The Oxford Dictionary of dance entry on "Cruel Garden"
 Josep Carreras – Barcelona Summer Olympics 1992
 Barcelona olímpica – Música de los Juegos, in Spanish
 40 Years of Dance on BBC Television: from Karsavina to Mukhamedov; from The moor's pavane to Strange fish

1945 births
Living people
Alumni of the Royal College of Music
20th-century classical composers
21st-century classical composers
20th-century pianists
Chilean composers
Chilean male composers
Spanish composers
Spanish male composers
Chilean pianists
Male pianists
Spanish pianists
Chilean male actors
Spanish male actors
21st-century pianists
20th-century Spanish male musicians
21st-century male musicians